Oligoryzomys moojeni is a species of rodent from South America in the genus Oligoryzomys of family Cricetidae. It is known only from central Brazil, where it is found in the cerrado and gallery forests. It is named after twentieth-century Brazilian zoologist João Moojen. Its karyotype has 2n = 70 and FNa = 84.

References

Literature cited

Mammals of Brazil
Oligoryzomys
Mammals described in 2005
Taxa named by Marcelo Weksler